Enver Mujezinović (born in Foča) was a Bosnian intelligence agent.

Yugoslav National Army 
He was an officer in the JNA's counter-intelligence service KOS. He was one of the KOS generations that were called "academic of his generation".

Army of the Republic of Bosnia and Herzegovina 
On April 15, 1992, after spending four years in Belgrade, he came to Sarajevo just as the war in Bosnia was heating up. He came with Sejo Čudić (chief of intelligence of the 16 corps of the JNA) and on April 18 they reported to Avdo Hebib, the minister of the Ministry of Internal Affairs of Bosnia and Herzegovina.

At the end of April, Jerko Doko, the defense minister and Munib Bisić the deputy defense minister empowered Mujezinović to form an intelligence agency in the Ministry of Defense of Bosnia and Herzegovina. In June 1992, the Sector for Security and Intelligence of the Ministry of Defense of the Republic of Bosnia and Herzegovina and Mujezinović its chief.

A year later he took over the position of Chief of the State Security Agency – Sarajevo Sector from Munir Alibabić, where he stayed until the formation of the Agency for Investigation and Documentation (Agencija za istraživanje i dokumentaciju - AID), where he took the position of a high-ranking agent.

Operation Trebević 
He masterminded the operation.

Military intelligence agencies
Officers of the Yugoslav People's Army
People from Foča